Tellurium compounds are compounds containing the element tellurium (Te). Tellurium belongs to the chalcogen (group 16) family of elements on the periodic table, which also includes oxygen, sulfur, selenium and polonium: Tellurium and selenium compounds are similar. Tellurium exhibits the oxidation states −2, +2, +4 and +6, with +4 being most common.

Tellurides 

Reduction of Te metal produces the tellurides and polytellurides, Ten2−. The −2 oxidation state is exhibited in binary compounds with many metals, such as zinc telluride, produced by heating tellurium with zinc.

 is unstable, whereas salts of its conjugate base [TeH]− are stable.

Halides 

The dihalides have not been obtained in pure form, although they are known decomposition products of the tetrahalides in organic solvents, and the derived tetrahalotellurates are well-characterized:

where X is Cl, Br, or I. These anions are square planar in geometry. Polynuclear anionic species also exist, such as the dark brown , and the black .

The square antiprismatic anion  is also attested. The other halogens do not form halides with tellurium in the +6 oxidation state, but only tetrahalides (and ) in the +4 state, and other lower halides (and two forms of ).

Oxocompounds 

Since then, however, existence in the solid phase is doubted and in dispute, although it is known as a vapor fragment; the black solid may be merely an equimolar mixture of elemental tellurium and tellurium dioxide.

Tellurium dioxide is formed by heating tellurium in air, where it burns with a blue flame.

The tellurium oxides and hydrated oxides form a series of acids, including tellurous acid, orthotelluric acid and metatelluric acid. The two forms of telluric acid form tellurate salts containing the TeO and TeO anions, respectively. Tellurous acid forms tellurite salts containing the anion TeO.

Zintl cations 

When tellurium is treated with concentrated sulfuric acid, the result is a red solution of the Zintl ion, .

Other tellurium Zintl cations include the polymeric  and the blue-black , consisting of two fused 5-membered tellurium rings. The latter cation is formed by the reaction of tellurium with tungsten hexachloride:

Organotellurium compounds 

Tellurium does not readily form analogues of alcohols and thiols, with the functional group –TeH, that are called tellurols. The –TeH functional group is also attributed using the prefix tellanyl-. Like H2Te, these species are unstable with respect to loss of hydrogen. Telluraethers (R–Te–R) are more stable, as are telluroxides.

Tritelluride quantum materials 

Recently, physicists and materials scientists have been discovering unusual quantum properties associated with layered compounds composed of tellurium that's combined with certain rare-earth elements, as well as yttrium (Y).

These novel materials have the general formula of R Te3, where "R " represents a rare-earth lanthanide (or Y), with the full family consisting of R = Y, La, Ce, Pr, Nd, Sm, Gd, Tb, Dy, Ho, Er & Tm (not yet observed are compounds containing Pm, Eu, Yb & Lu). These materials have a two-dimensional character within an orthorhombic crystal structure, with slabs of R Te separated by sheets of pure Te.

It is thought that this 2-D layered structure is what leads to a number of interesting quantum features, such as charge-density waves, high carrier mobility, superconductivity under specific conditions, and other peculiar properties whose natures are only now emerging.

For example, in 2022, a small group of physicists at Boston College in Massachusetts led an international team that used optical methods to demonstrate a novel axial mode of a Higgs-like particle in R Te3 compounds that incorporate either of two rare-earth elements (R = La, Gd). This long-hypothesized, axial, Higgs-like particle also shows magnetic properties and may serve as a candidate for dark matter.

See also 

 Sulfur compounds
 Selenium compounds
 Polonium compounds

References 

compounds
 
Chemical compounds by element